The Timurid Empire, self-designated as Gurkani (  Gūrkāniyān), was a late medieval, culturally Persianate Turco-Mongol empire that dominated Greater Iran in the early 15th century, comprising modern-day Iran, Iraq, Afghanistan, much of Central Asia, the South Caucasus, as well as parts of contemporary Pakistan, North India and Turkey. The empire was culturally hybrid, combining Turko-Mongolian and Persianate influences, with the last members of the dynasty being "regarded as ideal Perso-Islamic rulers".

The empire was founded by Timur (also known as Tamerlane), a warlord of Turco-Mongol lineage, who established the empire between 1370 and his death in 1405. He envisioned himself as the great restorer of the Mongol Empire of Genghis Khan, regarded himself as Genghis's heir, and associated closely with the Borjigin. Timur continued vigorous trade relations with Ming China and the Golden Horde, with Chinese diplomats like Ma Huan and Chen Cheng regularly traveling west to Samarkand to buy and sell goods. The empire led to the Timurid Renaissance, particularly during the reign of astronomer and mathematician Ulugh Begh.

By 1467, the ruling Timurid dynasty, or Timurids, had lost most of Persia to the Aq Qoyunlu confederation. However, members of the Timurid dynasty continued to rule smaller states, sometimes known as Timurid emirates, in Central Asia and parts of India. In the 16th century, Babur, a Timurid prince from Ferghana (modern Uzbekistan), invaded Kabulistan (modern Afghanistan) and established a small kingdom there. Twenty years later, he used this kingdom as a staging ground to invade the Delhi Sultanate in India and establish the Mughal Empire.

Names of the state 
Timurid historian Sharaf al-Din Ali Yazdi states in his work Zafarnama (Book of victories) that the name of the Timur's state was Turan. Timur personally ordered the name of his state as Turan be carved into a fragment of rock in Ulu Tagh mountainside (present-day Kazakhstan), known today as Karsakpay inscription. The original text, in particular, states:

"... Sultan of Turan, Timur bey went up with three hundred thousand troops for Islam on the Bulgarian Khan, Tokhtamysh Khan..."

In the literature of the Timurid era, the realm was formally referred to as Iran-u-Turan in the same manner that the words 'Turk' and 'Tajik' were paired together. The border between the two areas was considered to be at the Oxus River. Both terms were concerned with imperial traditions, Iran being Persian and Perso-Islamic, and Turan with the steppe empires of the Turks and the Mongols. Mawarannahr also appears as the name of the realm.

According to Shia authors, the ruling dynasty of Timurids was called Gurkani (Gurkāniyān). Gurkani means 'son-in-law', a title applied by Timur to help legitimise his rule as he could not claim Genghisid descent. To this end, he married a Genghisid princess, Saray Mulk Khanum.

Genealogy 

Timur allegedly wrote that his family was descended from Abu al-Atrāk ( 'Father of the Turks'), according to the statement of his father.

According to the Timurid ruler Ulugh Beg's Tārīkh-i arbaʿ ulūs ( 'History of Four Nations'), abridged as the Shajarat al-atrāk ( 'Genealogy of Turks'), Timurids were descendants of Turk, son of Yāfas (Japheth). Turk was commonly referred as "Father of the Turks". Mughul and Tatar were twin brothers and children of Aljeh Khan, and therefore fifth generation descendants of Turk.

Ulugh Beg's work on genealogy classified Mongols as Turks, while also praising their warrior spirit. Ulugh Beg included Yāfas (Japheth), Turk, Mughūl, Tātār and Ughūz in the genealogical record of the Genghisids and Timurids.

History

Timur conquered large parts of the ancient greater Persian territories in Central Asia, primarily Transoxiana and Khorasan, from 1363 onwards with various alliances. He took Samarkand in 1366 and Balkh in 1369, and was recognized as ruler over them in 1370. Acting officially in the name of Suurgatmish, the Chagatai khan, he subjugated Transoxania and Khwarazm in the years that followed. Already in the 1360s he had gained control of the western Chagatai Khanate and while as emir he was nominally subordinate to the khan, in reality it was now Timur who picked the khans, who became mere puppet rulers. The western Chagatai khans were continually dominated by Timurid princes in the 15th and 16th centuries and their figurehead importance was eventually reduced into total insignificance.

Rise

Timur began a campaign westwards in 1380, invading the various successor states of the Ilkhanate. By 1389, he had removed the Kartids from Herat and advanced into mainland Persia where he enjoyed many successes. This included the capture of Isfahan in 1387, the removal of the Muzaffarids from Shiraz in 1393, and the expulsion of the Jalayirids from Baghdad. In 1394–1395, he triumphed over the Golden Horde, following his successful campaign in Georgia, after which he enforced his sovereignty in the Caucasus.

Tokhtamysh, the khan of the Golden Horde, was a major rival to Timur in the region. 
Timur subjugated Multan and Dipalpur in modern-day Pakistan in 1398. He also had several military successes in North India. In 1398, he sent an army led by his grandson Pir Muhammad to cross the Indus and attack Multan; the successful siege lasted six months. Later in the same year, Timur himself marched the main army across the Indus, and he took Loni and Bhatnair fort, seven miles northeast of Delhi. In December 1398, Timur engaged with the armies of Sultan Mahmud Shah and won. This led to his triumphal entry into Delhi, where he conducted a massacre but spared the craftsmen to be sent to Samarkand. He left Delhi in January 1399. During Timur's entry into India, he was faced by a sultanate that was already in decline.

Later in 1400–1401 he conquered Aleppo, Damascus and eastern Anatolia. In 1401 he destroyed Baghdad, and in 1402 he defeated the Ottomans in the Battle of Ankara. This made Timur the most preeminent Muslim ruler of the time, as the Ottoman Empire plunged into civil war. Meanwhile, he transformed Samarkand into a major capital and seat of his realm.

Stagnation and decline

Timur appointed his sons and grandsons to the main governorships of the different parts of his empire, and outsiders to some others. After his death in 1405, the family quickly fell into disputes and civil wars, effectively weakening themselves, and many of the governors became conclusively independent. However, Timurid rulers continued to dominate Persia, Mesopotamia, Armenia, large parts of Azerbaijan, Afghanistan, Pakistan, minor parts of India, and much of Central Asia, although the Anatolian and Caucasian territories were lost by the 1430s to the Qara Qoyunlu. Due to the fact that the Persian cities were desolated by wars, the seats of Persian culture were now in Samarkand and Herat, cities that became the centre of the Timurid renaissance. The costs of Timur's conquests included the deaths of possibly 17 million people.

Shahrukh Mirza, the fourth ruler of the Timurids, dealt with the Qara Qoyunlu, who aimed to expand into Iran. But in the wake of Shahrukh's death, the Qara Qoyunlu under Jahan Shah drove the Timurids out to eastern Iran after 1447 and also briefly occupied Herat in 1458. After the death of Jahan Shah, Uzun Hasan, bey of the Aq Qoyunlu, conquered the holdings of the Qara Qoyunlu in Iran between 1469 and 1471.

Fall
The power of Timurids declined rapidly during the second half of the 15th century, largely due to the Timurid/Mongol tradition of partitioning the empire as well as several civil wars. The Aq Qoyunlu conquered most of Iran from the Timurids, and by 1500, the divided and war-torn Timurid Empire had lost control of most of its territory, and in the following years it was effectively pushed back on all fronts. Persia, the Caucasus, Mesopotamia, and Eastern Anatolia fell quickly to the Shiite Safavid Empire, secured by Shah Ismail I in the following decade. Much of the Central Asian lands was overrun by the Uzbeks of Muhammad Shaybani who conquered the key cities of Samarkand and Herat in 1505 and 1507, and who founded the Khanate of Bukhara. From Kabul, the Mughal Empire was established in 1526 by Babur, a descendant of Timur through his father and possibly a descendant of Genghis Khan through his mother. The dynasty he established is commonly known as the Mughal dynasty though it was directly inherited from the Timurids. By the 17th century, the Mughal Empire ruled most of India but eventually declined during the following century. The Timurid dynasty finally came to an end when the remaining nominal rule of the Mughals was abolished by the British Empire following the 1857 rebellion.

Culture

Although the Timurids hailed from the Barlas tribe, which was of Turkicized Mongol origin, they converted to Islam, and resided in Turkestan and Khorasan. Thus, the Timurid era had a dual character, reflecting both its Turco-Mongol origins and the Persian literary, artistic, and courtly high culture of the dynasty.

Language
During the Timurid era, Central Asian society was bifurcated, with the responsibilities of government and rule divided into military and civilian spheres along ethnic lines. At least in the early stages, the military was almost exclusively Turco-Mongolian, while the civilian and administrative element was almost exclusively Persian. The spoken language shared by all the Turko-Mongolians throughout the area was Chaghatay. The political organization hearkened back to the steppe-nomadic system of patronage introduced by Genghis Khan. The major language of the period, however, was Persian, the native language of the Tājīk (Persian) component of society and the language of learning acquired by all literate or urban people. Timur was already steeped in Persian culture and in most of the territories he incorporated, Persian was the primary language of administration and literary culture. Thus the language of the settled "diwan" was Persian, and its scribes had to be thoroughly adept in Persian culture, whatever their ethnic origin. Persian became the official state language of the Timurid Empire and served as the language of administration, history, belles lettres, and poetry. The Chaghatay language was the native and "home language" of the Timurid family, while Arabic served as the language par excellence of science, philosophy, theology and the religious sciences.

Literature

Persian

Persian literature, especially Persian poetry, occupied a central place in the process of assimilation of the Timurid elite to the Perso-Islamic courtly culture. The Timurid sultans, especially Shāh Rukh Mīrzā and his son Mohammad Taragai Oloğ Beg, patronized Persian culture. Among the most important literary works of the Timurid era is the Persian biography of Timur, known as Zafarnāmeh, written by Sharaf al-Din Ali Yazdi, which itself is based on an older Zafarnāmeh by Nizam al-Din Shami, the official biographer of Timur during his lifetime. The most famous poet of the Timurid era was Nūr ud-Dīn Jāmī, the last great medieval Sufi mystic of Persia and one of the greatest figures in Persian poetry. Hearing of the Persian culture of the Timurid empire, the Ottoman sultan Mehmed II encouraged those under his patronage to engage with the models provided by Persian cultural centers like Shiraz and Tabriz, and in particular by the Timurid court of Sultan Husayn Bayqara (r. 1469–1506) in Herat. Mehmed II was determined to foster the creation of a new language and literary-artistic culture for his burgeoning court in Istanbul.

In addition, some of the astronomical works of the Timurid sultan Ulugh Beg were written in Persian, although the bulk of it was published in Arabic. The Timurid prince Baysunghur also commissioned a new edition of the Persian national epic Shāhnāmeh, known as Shāhnāmeh of Baysunghur, and wrote an introduction to it. The Persian poet 'Ismat Allah Bukhari taught poetry to Khalil Sultan, grandson of Timur. According to T. Lenz:

Following the publication of Mukhtar al-Ikhtiyar, a legal manual that was used until the twentieth century, by the head magistrate of Bayqara in Herat, Persian was used as a language of jurisprudence (fiqh) under the late Timurids.

During the reign of sultan Husayn Bayqara, the Irshad al-zira'a, a Persian agricultural treatise, was written by Qasim b. Yusuf Abu Nasiri. Based on in-depth, first-hand conversations with farmers, the Irshad al-zira'a, covered the agricultural development of Herat and included minor architectural suggestions for gardens.

Chagatai
The Timurids also played a very important role in the history of Turkic literature. Based on the established Persian literary tradition, a national Turkic literature was developed in the Chagatai language. Chagatai poets such as Mīr Alī Sher Nawā'ī, Sultan Husayn Bāyqarā, and Zāhiruddīn Bābur encouraged other Turkic-speaking poets to write in their own vernacular in addition to Arabic and Persian. Nawa’i's work, predominantly based on Persian designs, was an attempt to create a culture that was specific to the Turkophone audience. The Bāburnāma, the autobiography of Bābur (although being highly Persianized in its sentence structure, morphology, and vocabulary), as well as Mīr Alī Sher Nawā'ī's Chagatai poetry are among the best-known Turkic literary works and have influenced many others.

Despite being spread throughout Central and South Asia, Chaghatai Turkic remained the junior partner to Persian, and was not promoted systemically in the Timurid Empire to replace Persian. Chaghatai texts were found at Sultan Husayn Bayqara's court, but the Timurid chancery and court continued to use Persian. Although the body of Turkic literature produced in Central Asia increased during the Timurid era of the fifteenth century—partially as a result of Mir 'Ali Shir Nawa'i's independent efforts toward the end of the Timurid century—it was still dwarfed by the Persian literary output that the Timurid elite supported. There are no surviving Turkic historical work from the Timurids, although two Turkic histories seem to have been written during the Timurid period before the flowering of the Timurid historiography in Persian.

Art

The golden age of Persian painting began during the reign of the Timurids. During this period – and analogous to the developments in Safavid Iran – Chinese art and artists had a significant influence on Persian art. Timurid artists refined the Persian art of the book, which combines paper, calligraphy, illumination, illustration and binding in a brilliant and colourful whole. The Mongol ethnicity of the Chaghatayid and Timurid khans was the source of the stylistic depiction of Persian art during the Middle Ages. These same Mongols intermarried with the Persians and Turks of Central Asia, even adopting their religion and languages. Yet their simple control of the world at that time, particularly in the 13th–15th centuries, reflected itself in the idealised appearance of Persians as Mongols. Though the ethnic make-up gradually blended into the Iranian and Mesopotamian local populations, the Mongol stylism continued well after and crossed into Asia Minor and even North Africa.

Timurid architecture

Timurid architecture drew on and developed many Seljuq traditions. Turquoise and blue tiles forming intricate linear and geometric patterns decorated the facades of buildings. Sometimes the interior was decorated similarly, with painting and stucco relief further enriching the effect. Timurid architecture is the pinnacle of Islamic art in Central Asia. Spectacular and stately edifices erected by Timur and his successors in Samarkand and Herat helped to disseminate the influence of the Ilkhanid school of art in India, thus giving rise to the celebrated Mughal (or Mongol) school of architecture. Timurid architecture started with the sanctuary of Ahmed Yasawi in present-day Kazakhstan and culminated in Timur's mausoleum Gur-e Amir in Samarkand. The 14th-century mausoleum of the conqueror is covered with "turquoise Persian tiles". Nearby, in the center of the ancient town, a "Persian style madrasa" (religious school) and a "Persian style mosque" by Ulugh Beg is observed. The mausoleums of Timurid princes, with their turquoise and blue-tiled domes remain among the most refined and exquisite Persian architecture. Axial symmetry is a characteristic of all major Timurid structures, notably the Shāh-e Zenda in Samarkand, the Musallah complex in Herat, and the mosque of Gawhar Shad in Mashhad. Double domes of various shapes abound, and the outsides are perfused with brilliant colors. Timur's dominance of the region strengthened the influence of his capital and Persian architecture upon India.

Military

In the Chagatay translation of Ali Yazdi's Zafarnama, Timur's army is called a "Chagatay army" (Čaġatāy čerigi).

The Timurids relied on the conscription of troops from settled populations. They were unable to fully subjugate many other nomadic tribes. This was not because of lack of military power as Timur succeeded in defeating them, but rather because he was unwilling to integrate autonomous tribes into his power structure due to his centralised governance. The tribes were too mobile to effectively suppress and the loss of their autonomy was unattractive to them. Hence, Timur was unable to win the loyalty of the tribes, and his hold over them did not survive his death.

The role of slave soldiers such as the ghilman and mamluks was considerably smaller in Mongol-based armies like the Timurids, as compared to other Islamic societies.

The Timurids had a contingent called the nambardar levy, which mostly consisted of native Iranians, and occasionally scholars and fiscal administrators. The nambardar were used to bolster the size of the army for large expeditions.

Symbols of the state 

The main symbol of the Timurids is thought to have been the so-called "sign of Timur", which is three equal circles (or rings) arranged in the form of an equilateral triangle. Ruy de Clavijo (d. 1412), the ambassador of the king of Castile to the court of Timur in 1403, and the Arab historian, Ibn Arabshah described the sign, which was encountered on the seal of the Amir, as well as on Timurid coins. Timur himself issued several coins bearing the "three annulets" tamgha on the reverse.

It is not known for certain what meaning the triangular sign had, but according to Clavijo, each circle meant a part of the world (of which there were three before 1492), and the owner of the symbol was their ruler. The sign consisting of circles perhaps tried to illustrate Timur's nickname of "Sahib-Qiran" (the ruler of three benevolent planets). According to Ruy de Clavijo the emblem adopted by Timur, composed of "three circlets" arranged into the shape of a triangle: 

Often images of abstract symbols (tamga) on coins were accompanied by the Persian expression "Rāstī rustī", which can be translated as "In rectitude lies salvation". It is also known that the same expression was used in flags as well.

Timurid flag

Standards with a golden crescent are mentioned in different historical sources. Some miniatures depict the red banners of Timur's army. During the Indian campaign, a black banner with a silver dragon was used. Before the campaign to China, however, Timur ordered the depiction of a golden dragon on the army's banners.

There is little certainty about the actual flag of the Timurid Empire. Yuka Kadoi studied the possibility that the "brown or originally silver flag with three circles or balls" in the Catalan Atlas could be associated with the "earlier dominions of the Timurid Empire", specifically referencing a flag raised over the city of Camull (the modern city of Khamil in Xinjiang). 

Yuka Kadoi also noted the existence of Timur's umbrella detail with three-dots decorative motif, as well some contemporary coins from Samarkand which also have the three circles as a motif. Beyond that, the evidence remains scant and ambiguous, but according to Kadoi "one can reasonably conclude that the flag with a tri-partite motif had a certain iconographic association with the Timurid Empire". For other authors, the flag with the three red crescent moons, which is seen all over Mongol dominions in eastern Asia in the Catalan Atlas (dated to 1375), is simply intended as the flag of the Empire of the Great Khan (Yuan China).

Rulers

Emperors (Emir)

 Timur
 Pir Muhammad (son of Jahangir) (ruled 1405–1407)
 Khalil Sultan
 Shah Rukh
 Ulugh Beg
 Abdal-Latif Mirza
 Abdullah Mirza
 Sultan Muhammad
 Abul-Qasim Babur Mirza
 Sultan Ahmed Mirza
 Sultan Mahmud Mirza
 Mirza Shah Mahmud
 Ibrahim Mirza
 Abu Sa'id Mirza
 Umar Shaikh Mirza II
 Babur
 Sultan Husayn Bayqara
 Yadgar Muhammad Mirza (ruled 1469–1470)
 Badi' al-Zaman Mirza

Governors Mirza

 Qaidu bin Pir Muhammad bin Jahāngīr 808–811 AH
 Abu Bakr bin Mīrān Shāh 1405–1407 (807–809 AH)
 Pir Muhammad (son of Umar Shaikh) 807–812 AH
 Rustam 812–817 AH
 Sikandar 812–817 AH
 Ala al-Dawla Mirza 851 AH
 Abu Bakr bin Muhammad 851 AH
 Sultān Muhammad 850–855 AH
 Muhammad bin Hussayn 903–906 AH
 Abul A'la Fereydūn Hussayn 911–912 AH
 Muhammad Mohsin Khān 911–912 AH
 Muhammad Zamān Khān 920–923 AH
 Shāhrukh II bin Abu Sa'id 896–897 AH
 Ulugh Beg II 873–907 AH
 Sultān Uways 1508–1522 (913–927 AH)

See also

Hazara people
History of Iran
List of Mongol states
List of Sunni Muslim dynasties
List of Turkic dynasties and countries
Turkic peoples

References

Further reading
 BĀYSONḠORĪ ŠĀH-NĀMA in Encyclopædia Iranica
 
 
 Elliot, Sir H. M.; edited by Dowson, John. The History of India, as Told by Its Own Historians. The Muhammadan Period; published by London Trubner Company 1867–77. (Online Copy: The History of India, as Told by Its Own Historians. The Muhammadan Period; by Sir H. M. Elliot; Edited by John Dowson; London Trubner Company 1867–1877 — This online copy has been posted by: The Packard Humanities Institute; Persian Texts in Translation; Also find other historical books: Author List and Title List)

External links 

 Timurid Empire 1370–1506
 Timurid Art

 
Mongol states
Medieval history of the Caucasus
15th century in Armenia
Medieval Georgia (country)
Medieval Azerbaijan
States in medieval Anatolia
Former countries in Central Asia
Former empires
Medieval Syria
Medieval Iraq
States and territories established in 1370
1507 disestablishments
History of Herat
Historical transcontinental empires